Tomáš Mikinič (born 22 November 1992) is a Slovak professional footballer who plays as a winger for Odra Opole.

Career
He made his debut for Spartak Trnava on 17 April 2010 against Košice.

References

External links

1992 births
Living people
Slovak footballers
Slovak expatriate footballers
FC Spartak Trnava players
FK Varnsdorf players
FC ViOn Zlaté Moravce players
FK Železiarne Podbrezová players
ŠKF Sereď players
MFK Lokomotíva Zvolen players
Odra Opole players
Slovak Super Liga players
2. Liga (Slovakia) players
Czech National Football League players
I liga players
Association football midfielders
Slovak expatriate sportspeople in Poland
Slovak expatriate sportspeople in the Czech Republic
Expatriate footballers in Poland
Expatriate footballers in the Czech Republic
Sportspeople from Trnava